PFG may refer to:

 Principal Financial Group - a publicly traded corporation based in Des Moines, Iowa, USA
 Peterson Field Guide - a book series
 A PFG - Bulgaria's top-level football league ("A" Professional Football Group); B PFG is the second-level league
Petroleum Facilities Guard - a Libyan oil company and militia
 Provident Financial Group - a British sub-prime lender, also described as a "doorstep lender", based in Bradford, England